Ion Adrian Zare (11 May 1959 – 23 February 2022) was a Romanian footballer who played as a defender. Zare died on 23 February 2022, at the age of 62.

International career
Ion Zare earned seven caps for Romania, making his debut on 11 April 1984 under coach Mircea Lucescu in a friendly which ended 0–0 against Israel. His second game was a 2–1 loss against West Germany at Euro 1984 when he was sent by Mircea Lucescu at half-time in order to replace Gheorghe Hagi. Zare's following five games were friendlies, the last one taking place on 11 March 1987, a 1–1 against Greece.

Honours
Bihor Oradea
Divizia B: 1981–82
Dinamo București
Cupa României: 1985–86

Notes

References

External links
 Romania National Team 1980–1989 – Details

1959 births
2022 deaths
Sportspeople from Oradea
Romanian footballers
Association football defenders
Romania international footballers
UEFA Euro 1984 players
Liga I players
FC Bihor Oradea players
FC Dinamo București players
Victoria București players
FCV Farul Constanța players
Nemzeti Bajnokság I players
BFC Siófok players
Pécsi MFC players
Romanian expatriate footballers
Expatriate footballers in Hungary
Romanian expatriate sportspeople in Hungary
Romanian football managers